Abha Dhillan (born 28 December 1953) is an Indian sports shooter. She competed in the women's 10 metre air pistol event at the 1992 Summer Olympics.

References

1953 births
Living people
Indian female sport shooters
Olympic shooters of India
Shooters at the 1992 Summer Olympics
Place of birth missing (living people)